Chris Board (born July 23, 1995) is an American football linebacker for the New England Patriots of the National Football League (NFL). He played college football at North Dakota State. He won three FCS Division 1 Championships with NDSU.

Professional career

Baltimore Ravens

Board signed with the Baltimore Ravens as an undrafted free agent on June 1, 2018. He made the Ravens 53-man roster, playing in all 16 games.

In Week 16 against the New York Giants in 2020, Board recorded his first two career sacks on Daniel Jones during the 27–13 win.

Board signed a one-year contract extension with the Ravens on March 16, 2021.

Detroit Lions
On March 23, 2022, Board signed a one-year contract with the Detroit Lions.

New England Patriots
On March 17, 2023, Board signed with the New England Patriots.

References

External links
 North Dakota State bio

1995 births
Living people
American football linebackers
Players of American football from Orlando, Florida
Timber Creek High School alumni
North Dakota State Bison football players
Baltimore Ravens players
Detroit Lions players
New England Patriots players